Satyajit Ray (2 May 1921 – 23 April 1992) was an Indian filmmaker who worked prominently in Bengali cinema. Ray received numerous awards and honours, including India's highest award in cinema, the Dadasaheb Phalke Award (1984) and India's highest civilian award, the Bharat Ratna (1992). He was also awarded the Commander of the National Order of the Legion of Honour, the highest decoration in France (1987) and an Honorary Award at the 64th Academy Awards (1991).

Often regarded as one of the greatest filmmakers of world cinema, Ray made his directorial debut in 1955 with Pather Panchali. The film earned critical acclaim and was awarded under the Best Film category at various award ceremonies and film festivals, including the 3rd National Film Awards (1955), 7th Berlin International Film Festival (1957), and 1st San Francisco International Film Festival (1957). Pather Panchali was also awarded the  "Prix du document humain" prize at the 9th Cannes Film Festival (1956). Ray won thirty-five National Film Awards during his four-decade career. Six of his filmsPather Panchali, Apur Sansar (1959), Charulata (1964), Goopy Gyne Bagha Byne (1968), Seemabaddha (1971), and Agantuk (1991)won the Best Feature Film. Three filmsJalsaghar (1958), Abhijan (1962), and Pratidwandi (1970)were awarded with Second Best Feature Film and Mahanagar (1963) was adjudged the Third Best Feature Film. Ray's 1961 documentary on Nobel laureate Rabindranath Tagore received awards at the Locarno and Montevideo film festivals as well as the National Film Award for Best Non-Feature Film. His Hindi film Shatranj Ke Khilari (1977) won the National Film Award for Best Feature Film in Hindi, and the Filmfare Award for Best Director. Ray's Apu Trilogy (1955–59), comprising Pather Panchali, Aparajito (1956) and Apur Sansar (1959), appeared in Time All-Time 100 Movies in 2005.

Ray won 21 awards for his direction, including seven Bengal Film Journalists' Association Awards, six Indian National Film Awards, two Silver Bear awards at the Berlin International Film Festival, and two Golden Gate Awards at the San Francisco International Film Festival. In addition to directing, Ray was a music composer and also wrote the screenplay, lyrics, and dialogues for several films. He won twelve awards for his screenplay writing, including one posthumous award in 1994, one award for his original story idea, seven awards for his dialogues, five awards for his music compositions, and two awards for lyric-writing.

Ray also received various awards and honours at international film festivals and universities. These include awards at the 9th Chicago International Film Festival (1973), 28th Berlin International Film Festival (1978), 11th Moscow International Film Festival (1979), 35th Cannes Film Festival (1982), 39th Venice International Film Festival (1982), 4th Tokyo International Film Festival (1991), and 35th San Francisco International Film Festival (1992). He was also awarded an honorary doctorate from the Royal College of Art (1974), a Doctor of Letters from the University of Oxford (1978), the British Film Institute Fellowship (1983), and two Sangeet Natak Akademi awards (1959, 1986).

Honorary awards

Bengal Film Journalists' Association Awards

The Bengal Film Journalists' Association Awards, commonly referred as BFJA Awards, are awarded annually by The Bengal Film Journalists' Association founded in 1937. Ray won thirty-nine awards for sixteen of his films and three awards for two films by other directors; Nityananda Dutta and Sandip Ray.

Bodil Awards

Established in 1948, the Bodil Awards are presented annually at a ceremony in Copenhagen by Danish Film Critics Association. Ray received two awards.

British Academy Film Awards

The British Academy Film Awards is an annual event organised by the British Academy of Film and Television Arts (BAFTA). Ray received three nominations.

Filmfare Awards

The Filmfare Awards are presented annually by The Times Group for the Bollywood films. Ray received two awards.

National Board of Review

Established in 1909, the National Board of Review awards are awarded annually by The National Board of Review of Motion Pictures. Ray received four awards.

National Film Awards

The Indian National Film Awards are presented by Directorate of Film Festivals during its annual ceremony to honour the best films of the Indian cinema in the given year. Ray won thirty-five awards for twenty-five of his films and one posthumous award for the film directed by his son Sandip Ray. He won maximum number of awards (six) for the Best Director.

Other annual film awards

Major film festival awards

Berlin International Film Festival

Founded in 1951, the Berlin International Film Festival, also called the Berlinale, is an annual film festival held in Berlin, Germany. Ray won nine awards and three nominations for seven of his films. He is one of the four directors to win the Silver Bear for Best Director more than once and received maximum number of nominations (seven) for the Golden Bear for Best Film.

Cannes Film Festival 

Originally set to be held in 1939 but subsequently held in 1946, the Cannes Film Festival is an annual film festival held in Cannes, France. Ray won two awards and four nominations for four of his films.

San Francisco International Film Festival 

Organized by the San Francisco Film Society and founded in 1957, the San Francisco International Film Festival is billed as "the longest-running film festival in the Americas". Ray won four awards for two of his films.

Venice Film Festival 

Initially named as "Esposizione d'Arte Cinematografica", the Venice Film Festival was founded in 1932 as part of the 18th Venice Biennale. Ray won five awards and one nomination for four of his films.

Other international film festival awards

See also

Explanatory notes

References

Bibliography

External links
 
 SatyajitRay.org
 Satyajit Ray Film and Study Center: University of California – Santa Cruz
 Satyajit Ray society

Satyajit Ray
Ray, Satyajit